Eatoniella fossa is a species of marine gastropod mollusc in the family Eatoniellidae. It was first described by Winston F. Ponder in 1965. It is endemic to the waters of New Zealand.

Description

Eatoniella fossa has a solid, smooth shell, with a groove between the inner lip and the molluscs body whorl. The shells' colour varied between brownish-yellow to white, with an occasional dark band. The holotype of the species measured 1.9mm by 1.2mm.

This species is easily distinguished by the channel between the aperture and the body whorl of the mollusc.

Distribution

The species is endemic to New Zealand. The holotype and five paratypes of the species was collected from reasonably deep water in the Whangaroa Harbour, Northland, to the west of Stephenson Island. In addition to the east coast of the Northland Peninsula, Eatoniella fossa has been identified near Manawatāwhi / Three Kings Islands, the Hen and Chicken Islands, and the Bay of Plenty, as far east as Hicks Bay.

References

Eatoniellidae
Gastropods described in 1965
Gastropods of New Zealand
Endemic fauna of New Zealand
Endemic molluscs of New Zealand
Molluscs of the Pacific Ocean
Taxa named by Winston Ponder